Punjab Regiment may refer to the following existing units: 

Punjab Regiment (India)
Punjab Regiment (Pakistan)

From 1922 to 1947, the British Indian Army included 6 numbered Punjab Regiments:

1st Punjab Regiment
2nd Punjab Regiment
8th Punjab Regiment
14th Punjab Regiment
15th Punjab Regiment
16th Punjab Regiment

From 1903 to 1922, the British Indian Army included 28 numbered Punjabi Regiments:

19th Punjabis
20th Duke of Cambridge's Own Punjabis - (20th Duke of Cambridge's Own Infantry (Brownlow's Punjabis) in 1904)
21st Punjabis
22nd Punjabis
24th Punjabis
25th Punjabis
26th Punjabis
27th Punjabis
28th Punjabis
29th Punjabis
30th Punjabis
31st Punjabis
33rd Punjabis
46th Punjabis
62nd Punjabis
66th Punjabis
67th Punjabis
69th Punjabis
72nd Punjabis
74th Punjabis
76th Punjabis
82nd Punjabis
84th Punjabis
87th Punjabis
89th Punjabis
90th Punjabis
91st Punjabis (Light Infantry)
92nd Punjabis